Lactic acid O-carboxyanhydride (lac-OCA) is an organic compound. It is used as a monomer  equivalent to lactic acid or lactide in the preparation of poly(lactic acid). When this monomer undergoes ring-opening polymerization, one equivalent of carbon dioxide gas is released for every lactic acid unit incorporated into the polymer:

This compound is prepared by treatment of lactic acid or its salts with phosgene or one of its equivalents, e.g. diphosgene.

References

Carbonate esters
Monomers